Niemitz's tarsier (Tarsius niemitzi) is a species of tarsier. It was named in honor of the German evolutionary biologist Carsten Niemitz in 2019. The species is found on an archipelago off the coast of Sulawesi called the Togian Islands. In Indonesian it is called ,  or  while Niemitz's tarsier has been suggested as the English common name.

It is thought to be endangered by the IUCN Red List due to habitat loss.

References

Niemitz's tarsier
Endemic fauna of Indonesia
Mammals of Sulawesi
Primates of Indonesia
Niemitz's tarsier
Taxa named by Colin Groves
Taxa named by Russell Mittermeier